"Memphis" is a song by Australian rock and pop band The Badloves and released in April 1994 as the fourth and final single from the band's debut studio album Get On Board. The song peaked at number 73 on the Australian ARIA Charts.

On the album liner notes, Michael Spiby says "India has Buddha, America has Elvis. Inspired by the movie Mystery Train (film), the song is about Americans' seemingly inexplicable obsession with the dead man from Graceland".

Track listing
CD single (D11474)
 "Memphis" - 4:45
 "Forgiven" - 3:15
 "Spirit in the Sky" (demo) - 2:55

Charts

References

1993 songs
1994 singles
Mushroom Records singles
The Badloves songs
Songs about Elvis Presley